Year 1207 (MCCVII) was a common year starting on Monday (full calendar) under the Julian calendar.

Events 
 By place 

 Byzantine Empire 
 Spring – Siege of Attalia: Seljuk forces led by Sultan Kaykhusraw I besiege the city port of Attalia (modern-day Antalya) with siege machines. After a siege of more than 2 months, the city is captured, Kaykhusraw allows his forces 3 days of looting and slaughtering. The capture of the port gives the Seljuk Turks a major path into the Mediterranean.
 September 4 – Battle of Messinopolis: Latin forces under Boniface of Montferrat are ambushed and defeated at Messinopolis. Boniface is killed and his head is sent to Kaloyan, ruler (tsar) of the Bulgarian Empire. Seeking to take advantage of the situation, Kaloyan besieges Thessalonica. In October, he dies under mysterious circumstances.

 Europe 
 February 2 – Terra Mariana (or Medieval Livonia), comprising present-day Estonia and Latvia, is established as a principality of the Holy Roman Empire. During the existence of Terra Mariana, there is a constant struggle over supremacy, between the lands ruled by the Teutonic Order, the secular German nobility, and the citizens of the Hanseatic towns of Riga and Reval.
 Prince Mstislav Mstislavich (the Daring) clashes with his uncle Rurik Rostislavich, Grand Prince of Kiev, and is forced to surrender the town of Torchesk (a major centre of resistance against Polovtsian raids).
 Pope Innocent III declares for King Philip of Swabia as Holy Roman Emperor a reversal of his previous support for Philip's rival Otto IV. 

 England 
 King John (Lackland) introduces the first income tax. One-thirteenth of income from rents, and moveable property has to be paid. Collected locally by sheriffs and administered by the Exchequer. The tax is unpopular with the English nobility and especially in the churches and monasteries. The tax does raise a lot of money for John, doubling his annual income for the year.
 May 24 – John (Lackland) still refuss to accept Stephen Langton as archbishop, Innocent III threatens to place England under an Interdict. In response, John confiscates church property. Many of the English bishops of the great churches in the country flee abroad to the Continent.
 November – Leeds, a market town in West Yorkshire, receives its first charter (approximate date).

 Asia 
 Jochi, eldest son of Genghis Khan, subjugates people of the Siberian forest (taiga); the Uriankhai, the Oirats, the Barga, the Khakas, the Buryats, and the Tuvans. Extending the northern border of the Mongol Empire.
 Hōnen and his followers of the Pure Land sect are persecuted and exiled to remote parts of Japan, while a few are executed, for what the government considers heretical Buddhist teachings.
 Before 1207 – Kosho writes Kuya Preaching, during the Kamakura period (it is now kept at Rokuharamitsu-ji Temple in Kyoto).
 October 7 – The Indramayu Regency in Nusantara is established.

 By topic 

 Economy 
 The first documentary evidence of forced loans in Venice. This technique becomes the staple of public finance in Europe, until the 16th century.

 Religion 
 June 17 – Stephen Langton is consecrated as archbishop of Canterbury, by Innocent III at Viterbo.

Births 
 July 7 – Elizabeth of Hungary, Hungarian princess (d. 1231)
 August 13 – Malik ibn al-Murahhal, Moroccan poet (d. 1299)
 September 30 – Rumi, Persian scholar and mystic (d. 1273)
 October 1 – Henry III (Winchester), English king (d. 1272)
 Adelasia of Torres, Italian noblewoman and judge (d. 1259)
 Canute (or Knud Valdemarsen), duke of Estonia (d. 1260)
 Elen ferch Llywelyn (the Elder), English countess (d. 1253)
 Fujiwara no Akiuji, Japanese nobleman and poet (d. 1274)
 Fujiwara no Ariko, Japanese empress consort (d. 1286)
 Gilbert Marshal, English nobleman and knight (d. 1241)
 Henry II, Dutch nobleman (House of Reginar) (d. 1248)
 Jakuen, Japanese Buddhist monk and scholar (d. 1299)
 John of Scotland, Scottish nobleman and knight (d. 1237)
 Margaret of Louvain, Flemish servant and saint (d. 1237)
 Ottone Visconti, Italian nobleman and archbishop (d. 1295)
 Philip I, French nobleman (House of Savoy) (d. 1285)
 Raymond II (or Raimond), French nobleman (d. 1263)
 Sadr al-Din al-Qunawi, Persian philosopher (d. 1274)
 Vladislaus II, Bohemian nobleman and knight (d. 1227)

Deaths 
 February 7 – Sambor I, duke of Pomerania (b. 1150)
 March 1 – Fernando Afonso, Portuguese Grand Master
 May 3 – Fujiwara no Kanezane, Japanese nobleman 
 May 7 – Abdul Razzaq Gilani, Persian jurist (b. 1134)
 June 6 – Gerardo dei Tintori, Italian mystic (b. 1134)
 June 13 – Xie, Chinese empress consort (b. 1135)
 June 19 – Ubaldo Lanfranchi, Italian archbishop
 August 21 – Simon of Wells, bishop of Chichester
 September 4
 Boniface I of Montferrat, Italian nobleman 
 Raimbaut de Vaqueiras, French troubadour
 October – Kaloyan, ruler (tsar) of the Bulgarian Empire
 October 3 – Xin Qiji, Chinese general and poet (b. 1140)
 November 3 – Hartwig II, German archbishop
 November 24 – Han Tuozhou, Chinese statesman (b. 1152)
unknown date – Amalric of Bena, French theologian and mystic
probable
 Bona of Pisa, Italian nun and mystic (b. 1156)
 David Soslan, Alanian prince and king consort

References